Karel Pacner (29 March 1936 – 7 April 2021) was a Czech publicist, journalist, and writer.

Pacner was born in Janovice nad Úhlavou, Czechoslovakia. His main area of focus was space exploration. He died in Prague, aged 85. Asteroid 311119 Pacner, discovered at the Kleť Observatory was named in his memory on 16 June 2021.

References

External links
 
 Karel Pacner, only Czech to cover Apollo 11, moon landing from Cape Canaveral, dies at 85
 Memory of nations: Karel Pacner

1936 births
2021 deaths
Czech writers
Czech journalists
People from Klatovy District
Space advocates
Prague University of Economics and Business alumni